The 2002 Primera B de Chile (known as Campeonato Nacional BancoEstado de Primera B for sponsorship reasons) was the 52nd completed season of the Primera B de Chile.

Deportes Puerto Montt (tournament’s champion) alongside Universidad de Concepción were promoted to top-tier after finishing in the first and second places respectively from the promotion playoffs, whilst Deportes Iquique lost the category, relegating for first-time since its foundation to the third-tier.

First stage

North Zone

South Zone

Second Stage

Group A

Group B

Final stage

Promotion playoffs

Relegation Playoffs

See also
Chilean football league system

References

External links
 RSSSF 2002

Primera B de Chile seasons
Primera B
Chil